Emoia oriva is a species of lizard in the family Scincidae. It is found in Fiji.

References

Emoia
Reptiles described in 2012
Taxa named by George Robert Zug